Blinder is a 2013 Australian sports drama film directed by Richard Gray and starring Oliver Ackland, Rose McIver, Anna Hutchison and Jack Thompson. The film is an Australian rules football drama set predominantly in Torquay, Victoria.  The film is about Tom Dunn, an aspiring football star who fled Australia following a scandal. Dunn returns to Australia to restore his reputation.

Plot

The Torquay Tigers are a successful team playing in the Bellarine Football League. Their coach Charlie "Chang" Hyde has guided the team into their first Grand Final in seven years. There is talk that the team's best three players, Dunn, Mortimer and Regan, may get drafted by one or more AFL clubs. On the eve of the match the coach drops star player Tom Dunn for poor attitude. The club is successful and wins the flag. Dunn feels left out of the celebrations and strikes up a friendship with Rose Walton. Rose's younger sister Sammy, (McIver) is part of the teams support staff by carrying water for the players.

The following year, Torquay again plays off for the Grand Final and manage a come from behind win. At the after-match celebration party, young Sammy had under aged sex with Mortimer.  Dunn who had been told by Rose to look out for her sister was drugged by a spiked drink and passes out. The local paper publishes photos of the night with of the out-of-control party and the team goes from heroes to zeros overnight. The scandal the follows rips the team apart with Dunn leaving for America. Only Regan gets drafted, the other two didn't because the major league clubs didn't want to be caught up in the scandal.

Ten years later Chang collapses and dies while addressing the players during a match on the eve of the finals, Dunn returns from America for the funeral and to face his demons, the girlfriend who scorns him and his best friend. Feeling uneasy about being in his hometown after many years, Dunn realise that the townfolk haven't forgotten him or the scandal. Rose had moved on and married and still had bitterness towards him.

Regan, whose football career was ruined by injury had returned to be Changs's assistant. Encouraged to take over the team, he asks Dunn and Mortimer to assist him as he coaches the team into the finals.

Cast
Oliver Ackland as Tom Dunn 
Anna Hutchison as Rose Walton
Angus Sampson as Franky Tanner
Jack Thompson as Coach Charlie Hyde "Chang"
Josh Helman as James Mortimer "Morts"
Rose McIver as Sammy Walton
Bobby Morley as Nick Regan
Zoe Carides as Ally Dunn
 Aaron Jakubenko as Dawson

Production and release
The film was scheduled to have a 10-week shoot beginning 20 February 2012 in Torquay, Victoria, Australia, before moving to Boston, Massachusetts, US.

Well Go USA released Blinder in US theaters and on digital HD simultaneously on 7 November 2014.

Reception
Blinder was not a commercial success, taking $47,394 on its opening weekend. The film was shown on 99 screens, giving it an average of $478 per screen.

The film was negatively reviewed by critics. SBS critic Don Groves gave the film 2 stars out of 5, saying it was "an uninspiring, B-grade effort". Film critic Luke Buckmaster, writing for Crikey, said, "Without a trace of self-awareness, Blinder stakes its claim as one of the most perverse twists on sports movie conventions you will ever see, earnestly inviting the audience to join the on field 'excitement' and – wait for it – to egg on suspected sex offenders."

References

External links

2013 films
2010s sports drama films
Australian sports drama films
Australian rules football films
Films directed by Richard Gray
2013 drama films
2010s English-language films